(The) Man on the Train may refer to:
 The Man on the Train (2002 film), a French crime-drama film
 Man on the Train (2011 film), a Canadian crime-drama film

See also
 The Man from the Train, a 2017 true crime book